Maolin District (Rukai: Teldreka) is a mountain indigenous district of Kaohsiung, Taiwan. Maolin is one of the least populated districts in Taiwan, since it is located just to the south of the Central Mountain Range. The height ranges from 230 meters to 2700 meters above sea level, with a hot tropical and humid weather. The main population of Maolin district is the indigenous Rukai people. Maolin is well suited for tourism due to its unique scenery and ecology. Maolin National Scenic Area is located in the district.

Geography

With a population of 1,915 as of December 2014, Maolin District has the fewest population among other districts in Kaohsiung.
Area: 194 km2
Population: 1,936 people (January 2023)
Postal Code: 851
Households: 584

History

Administrative divisions
Maolin District consists of 3 villages and 19 neighborhoods. Along with Namasia District, Maolin District has the fewest village among other districts in Kaohsiung.
 Duona Village (多納里)
 Maolin Village (茂林里)
 Wanshan Village (萬山里)

Tourist attractions

 Maolin National Scenic Area
 Duona Hot Spring
 Duona Stone Houses
 Duona Suspension Bridge
 Gorge of Serenity
 Lover's Gorge(Chinese: 情人谷)
 Maolin Gorge
 Meiya Gorge(Chinese: 美雅谷)
 Mount Dragon Head
 Mount Gueishing
 Mount Serpent Head
 Old Jiadong Tree

Notable natives
 Rachel Liang, singer
 Saidai Tarovecahe, member of Legislative Yuan

Transportation
 Duonagao Suspension Bridge
 Teldreka Bridge

See also
 Meinong
 Pingtung

References

External links